The Sylhet Division cricket team is a Bangladeshi first-class team representing the Sylhet Division, one of the country's seven administrative regions. The team competes in the National Cricket League and was formerly a participant in the now-defunct National Cricket League One-Day. In the short-lived National Cricket League Twenty20 competition, played in the 2009–10 season only, Sylhet adopted the name Sultans of Sylhet and played in their official yellow and blue colours. The equivalent team in the Bangladesh Premier League (BPL) is the Sylhet Strikers.

Sylhet's main home ground is the Sylhet International Cricket Stadium in Sylhet city, which has a 13,500 capacity. They have never won the NCL title, and their sole honour is winning the inaugural One-Day League in 2001–02.

Honours
 National Cricket League (0) – 
 One-Day Cricket League (1) – 2001–02

Seasons

Current squad
, The current squad for 2019–20 season

Notable players
The following is a list of players who have played for both Sylhet and Bangladesh.

 Abul Hasan
 Alok Kapali
 Aminul Islam Bulbul
 Anisur Rahman
 Athar Ali Khan
 Dhiman Ghosh
 Enamul Haque
 Farhad Reza
 Faruk Ahmed
 Golam Faruq
 Hasibul Hossain
 Mashrafe Mortaza
 Mohammad Rafique
 Moniruzzaman
 Mosharrof Hossain
 Mushfiqur Rahim
 Nadif Chowdhury
 Nasir Ahmed
 Nazmul Hossain
 Nazmus Sadat
 Niamur Rashid
 Rajin Saleh
 Robiul Islam
 Tapash Baisya

Sylhet players who have played for countries other than Bangladesh:
  Indika de Saram
  Faisal Iqbal
  Kaushalya Weeraratne

References

External links
 CricInfo team profile
 Sylhet Division at CricketArchive

Bangladeshi first-class cricket teams
Sylhet Division
Bangladesh National Cricket League
1999 establishments in Bangladesh
Cricket clubs established in 1999